Inpyeong-dong is a dong in Tongyeong City, in far southeastern South Korea.  A peninsula, it is joined to land on the east.  Inpyeong-dong also includes several small islands.

The Tongyeong campus of Gyeongsang National University is located in Inpyeong-dong.  The highest point in the dong is Cheonamsan, 258 meters above sea level.

See also
Geography of South Korea
Subdivisions of South Korea

Tongyeong
Neighbourhoods in South Korea